Kenneth M. Dye (born 1936) was the Auditor General of Canada from 1981 to 1991, under both the Trudeau and Mulroney administrations.

Early life 
Trained as a chartered accountant at Simon Fraser University, and articled as a clerk with the firm of Grant Thornton Chartered Accountants, of British Columbia. He graduated with his MBA in 1971.

During his term as Auditor-General, Dye reorganized the office to take advantage of new technologies, assisted the governments of China, Australia and Russia in developing their own government auditing bodies.

Upon leaving office in 1991, Dye served as president of the Worker's Compensation Board of BC.

From 2004 to 2013, Dye was senior vice-president of the Cowater Accountability Group, a subsidiary of Cowater International Inc. Dye is also the Secretary/Treasurer of Canadian Council on Smoking and Health (CCSH).

References

1936 births
Living people
20th-century Canadian civil servants
Simon Fraser University alumni
Canadian auditors